Hatfield Main Football Club was a football club originally based in Stainforth and then Dunscroft, South Yorkshire]], England.

History
The club was formed in 1913, entering the FA Cup for the first time in 1929. They spent their early years in local Doncaster leagues. In 1955 they joined Division Two of the Yorkshire League. After finishing fourth in 1961–62 they were promoted to Division One, but were relegated at the end of the following season. In 1963–64 they finished second in Division Two and were promoted again, and remained in Division One until being relegated at the end of the 1969–70 season. In 1972–73 they were promoted back to Division One, but were relegated back to Division Two at the end of the 1976–77 season.

When the Yorkshire League merged into the Northern Counties East League (NCEL) in 1982, Hatfield Main were placed in Division One North. Two seasons later they were transferred to Division One Central, and in 1985–86 were placed in Division One. After finishing third in 1986–87 they were promoted to the Premier Division. They finished as runners-up in 1988–89, but the following season they finished bottom and were relegated. In 1994–95 they won Division One and were promoted back to the Premier Division. The following season they won the Premier Division title, however they were denied promotion to the Northern Premier League due to ground grading issues, which resulted in the manager and most of the team leaving. In 1998 they finished bottom of the Premier Division and were relegated.

In 2003 they pulled out of the NCEL and rejoined the Doncaster & District Senior League (D&DSL). They won the Division One title in 2004 and won promotion to the Premier Division, and in 2005 they joined the Central Midlands League (CMFL). Hatfield spent five years in the CMFL, in which time they won promotion to the Supreme Division, but in 2010 they again rejoined the Doncaster Senior League.

After two further years in the D&DSL the club resigned, and disbanded after 99 years of existence. However, the club were reformed for 1 season in 2021–22 season, entering the Doncaster League.

League and cup history

Honours

League
Yorkshire League Division One
Runners-up: 1965–66Yorkshire League Division Two
Promoted: 1961–62, 1963–64, 1972–73
Northern Counties East League Premier Division
Champions: 1995–96
Northern Counties East League Division One
Promoted: 1986–87, 1994–95 (champions)
Central Midlands League Premier Division
Promoted: 2006–07 (champions)
Doncaster & District Senior League Champions  1933 
     *Division One  *Promoted: 2003–04, 2010–11

CupWest Riding County Cup'''
Winners: 1961–62, 1963–64

Records
Best FA Cup performance: 2nd Qualifying Round, 1930–31, 1968–69, 1972–73
Best FA Trophy performance: 2nd Qualifying Round, 1973–74, 1975–76
Best FA Vase performance: 4th Round, 1983–84, 1987–88

References

Football clubs in England
Football clubs in South Yorkshire
Association football clubs established in 1936
1936 establishments in England
Association football clubs disestablished in 2012
2012 disestablishments in England
Yorkshire Football League
Northern Counties East Football League
Doncaster & District Senior League
Central Midlands Football League
Mining association football teams in England